This is a list of mobile apps developed by Google for its Android operating system. All of these apps are available for free from the Google Play Store, although some may be incompatible with certain devices (even though they may still function from an APK file) and some apps are only available on Pixel and/or Nexus devices. Some of these apps may be pre-installed on some devices, depending upon the device manufacturer and the version of Android. A few, such as Gboard, are not supported on older versions of Android.

Active 

 Accessibility Scanner
 Action Blocks
 Adaptive Connectivity Services (formerly Connectivity Health Services)
 AI Test Kitchen
 Android Accessibility Suite
 Android Auto
 Android Beta Feedback
 Android Dev Summit
 Android Device Policy
 Android System Intelligence
 Android System WebView
 Android System WebView Beta
 Android System WebView Canary
 Android System WebView Dev
 Android TV Core Services
 Android TV Data Saver
 Android TV Home
 Android TV Launcher
 Android TV Remote
 Android TV Remote Service
 ARCore Elements
 Audio Factory
 Backdrop Daydream
 Beacon Tools
 Blogger
 Calculator
 Cameos on Google
 Camera Switches
 Cardboard
 Cardboard Camera
 Cardboard Design Lab
 Carrier Services
 Chrome Remote Desktop
 Chromecast Built-in
 Clock
 Cloud Console
 Cloud Next
 Contacts
 Creative Preview
 Crowdsource
 Currents (formerly Google+ for G Suite)
 Data Restore Tool
 Data Transfer Tool
 Device Health Services
 Device Lock Controller
 Device Utility
 Digital Wellbeing
 Dive Case Connector for Google Camera
 eSIM Manager
 Fabby
 Family Link Manager
 Fast Pair Validator
 Files by Google
 Flutter Gallery
 Find My Device
 Gallery Go by Google Photos
 Gboard
 Gboard Go
 GIF Keyboard by Tenor
 Gmail
 Gmail Go
 Google
 Google App for Android TV
 Google Go
 Google Admin (formerly Google Settings)
 Google AdMob
 Google Ads
 Google AIY Projects
 Google Analytics
 Google Apps Device Policy
 Google Arts & Culture
 Google Arts & Culture VR
 Google Assistant
 Google Assistant Go
 Google Assistant – Interpreter Mode
 Google Authenticator
 Google BrailleBack
 Google Calendar
 Google Camera
 Camera from Google
 Google Chat (formerly Hangouts Chat)
 Google Chrome
 Chrome Beta
 Chrome Canary (Unstable)
 Chrome Dev
 Google Classroom
 Google Cloud Search (formerly Google Springboard)
 Google Connectivity Services
 Google Docs
 Google Drive
 Google Earth
 Google Family Link for Children and Teens
 Google Family Link for Parents
 Google Fi
 Google Fiber
 Google Fit
 Google Handwriting Input
 Google Health Studies
 Google Home (formerly Chromecast and Google Cast)
 Google I/O
 Google Indic Keyboard
 Google Japanese Input
 Google Keep
 Google Korean Input
 Google Lens
 Google Meet (formerly Hangouts Meet and Google Duo)
 Google News
 Google One
 Google Opinion Rewards
 Google Pay
 Google Photos
 Google Pixel Buds
 Google Pixel Watch
 Google Pixel Watch Faces
 Google Pixel Watch Services
 Google Play Books (formerly Google eBookstore)
 Google Play Console
 Google Play Games
 Google Play Protect Service
 Google Play Services
 Google Play Services for AR (formerly ARCore)
 Google Podcasts
 Google Primer
 Google Santa Tracker
 Google Sheets
 Google Shopping (formerly Google Shopping Express and Google Express)
 Google Slides
 Google Support Services
 Google Tasks
 Google Time Zone Data
 Google Translate
 Google TV (formerly Google Movies and Google Play Movies & TV)
 Google TV Home
 Google Voice
 Google VR Services
 Google Wallet (formerly Android Pay and Google Pay)
 Google WifiNanScan
 Google WifiRttLocator
 Health Connect by Android
 Intersection Explorer
 Ivy Big Number Calculator
 GnssLogger App
 Jamboard
 Live Channels
 Live Transcribe & Sound Notifications (formerly Live Transcribe)
 Local Services Ads by Google
 Looker Mobile
 Lookout
 Maps
 Google Maps Go
 Navigation for Google Maps Go
 Messages (formerly Messenger and Android Messages)
 Motion Sense Bridge
 Motion Stills
 MyGlass
 Glass Enterprise Companion
 Notable Women
 Online Insights Study
 Personal Safety
 Phone by Google
 PhotoScan by Google Photos
 Pixel Ambient Services
 Pixel Launcher
 Pixel Live Wallpaper
 Pixel Stand
 Pixel Tips
 Playbook for Developers
 Playground (formerly AR Stickers)
 Private Compute Services
 Project Activate
 Project Baseline
 Project Relate
 Read Along by Google (formerly Bolo)
 Recorder
 Science Journal
 Security Hub
 Settings Services (formerly Settings Suggestions)
 SIM Manager
 Snapseed
 Socratic by Google
 Soli Sandbox
 Sound Amplifier
 Sounds
 Speech Services by Google
 Switch Access
 Toontastic 3D
 Voice Access
 VR180
 Wallpapers
 Waze
 Wear OS by Google (formerly Android Wear)
 Wear OS Phone
 Wear OS System UI
 YouTube
 YouTube for Android TV
 YouTube Go
 YouTube Kids
 YouTube Kids for Android TV
 YouTube Music
 YouTube Music for Android TV
 YouTube Music for Chromebook
 YouTube Studio (formerly YouTube Creator Studio)
 YouTube TV
 YouTube TV for Android TV
 YouTube VR

Discontinued 

 AdSense (merged with Google Ads)
 AdWords Express (merged with the main Google Ads app)
 Android Auto for Phone Screens (merged with the Google Assistant)
 Androidify
 Android Things Toolkit
 Cloud Print
 Datally (formerly Triangle)
 Daydream
 Daydream Elements
 Daydream Keyboard
 DoubleClick for Publishers (merged with AdWords)
 Google Expeditions (merged with Google Arts & Culture)
 FameBit
 Fiber TV
 Google+
 Google Allo
 Google Body
 Google Cantonese Input
 Google Cast Receiver
 Google Clips
 Google Currents (merged with Google Play Newsstand)
 Google Duo (merged with Google Meet)
 Google Finance
 Google Gesture Search
 Google Goggles (merged with Google Lens)
 Hangouts (merged with Google Chat and Google Meet)
 Google Listen (merged with Google Play Music and Google Reader)
 Google Maps Navigation (merged with the main Google Maps app)
 Grasshopper
 Material Gallery
 Measure
 Google My Business
 Google My Maps
 Google News & Weather (merged with Google News)
 Google Now Launcher (merged with the Google app)
 Google Pay Send (formerly Google Wallet) (merged with Google Pay)
 Google PDF Viewer (merged with Google Drive)
 Google Pinyin Input
 Google Play Magazines (merged with Google Play Newsstand)
 Google Play Music (formerly Music Beta and Google Music) (merged with YouTube Music and Google Podcasts)
 Google Play Newsstand (merged with Google News)
 Google Reader
 Google Spaces
 Stadia
 Google Station Onsite
 Google TalkBack (merged with Android Accessibility Suite)
 Google Trips
 Google Voice (merged with Google Hangouts)
 Google Voice Search (merged with Google Now)
 Google Wifi (merged with Google Home)
 Google Zhuyin Input
 Hangouts Dialer
 Inbox by Gmail (merged with the main Gmail app)
 Jacquard by Google
 Jump Inspector
 Nest (merged with the Google Home app)
 One Today by Google
 MyTracks (merged with Google Fit)
 Quickoffice
 Scoreboard
 Screenwise Meter
 Spotlight Stories
 Google Street View (merged with the main Google Maps app)
 Tango (merged with ARCore)
 Trusted Contacts (merged with Google Maps)
 YouTube Gaming (merged with the main YouTube app)
 YouTube Remote (merged with the main YouTube app)

See also 
 List of Google products
 Google Mobile Services

References 

Android (operating system) software
Google
Google software
Lists of mobile apps
Google lists